648 Pippa is a minor planet orbiting the Sun. Photometric measurements made from the Oakley Southern Sky Observatory during 2012 gave a light curve with a period of 9.263 ± 0.001 hours and a variation in brightness of 0.31 ± 0.03 in magnitude. This is inconsistent with a period estimate of 5.2 ± 0.3 made in 2004. It was named after Pippa, the title character in Gerhardt Hauptmann's novel Und Pippa tanzt.

References

External links 
 
 

000648
Discoveries by August Kopff
Named minor planets
000648
19070911